Sherkat-e Ran (also Romanized as Sherḵat-e Rān) is a village in Poshtkuh Rural District, in the Central District of Firuzkuh County, Tehran Province, Iran. At the 2006 census, its population was 11, in 4 families.

References 

Populated places in Firuzkuh County